Tishreen Park is the largest park in Damascus, Syria. It is located near Umayyad Square and Tishreen Palace.

A large Syrian flag was installed in the park in July 2010 to mark the tenth anniversary of Bashar Al Assad becoming president.

The park hosts the annual Damascus International Flower Show, which at its peak before the war would be visited by hundreds of thousands of people per year.

References 

Damascus
Parks in Syria